Government Cuddalore Medical College Formerly (Rajah Muthiah Medical College and Hospital) is a government medical college and hospital located in Chidambaram, Cuddalore district, Tamil Nadu, India. It operates as Government Cuddalore Medical College and Hospital a 1200-bed tertiary level centre with 24-hour emergency department and coronary care unit. It is affiliated to Tamil Nadu Dr. M.G.R. Medical University from 2021.

History 
Rajah Muthiah Institute of Health Sciences was established in the year 1980 with the opening of the Dental College. Thereafter in the second phase of development, the Rajah Muthiah Medical College Hospital (RMMCH) was established in the year 1985. In 1996 RMMC was the location of the murder of Pon Navarasu, a murder which occurred during a ragging incident, and led to the passing of the first anti-ragging legislation in India.
In 2010, the Kalaignar Health Insurance Scheme for Life-Saving Treatments at RMMCH was instituted.

On 14 February 2020, during the presentation of the budget allocation for the Ministry of Health and Family Welfare as part of the 2020 Union budget of India, it was announced that the government will take over RMMC and turn it into a government medical college. This was affected by an order issued on 27 January 2021, and the affiliating university was changed from Annamalai University to  Tamil Nadu Dr. M.G.R. Medical University.

Notable alumni 
 C. Vijayabaskar, Indian politician, Former Minister of  Health and Family Welfare of Tamil Nadu

References

External links 
 

Medical colleges in Tamil Nadu
Education in Cuddalore district
Educational institutions established in 1985
1985 establishments in Tamil Nadu